A4 pod is a killer whale family in British Columbia. As of March 2013, it consists of three matrilines and 15 members and is the family of Springer, the first orca to be successfully reintroduced to the wild after being handled by humans. A4 pod is part of the northern resident orcas found in coastal waters ranging from mid-Vancouver Island to southeastern Alaska up through Haida Gwaii (formerly the Queen Charlotte Islands). The community is made up of three clans known as A, G and R clans, each possessing a distinctive dialect and consisting of several related pods. A4 pod belongs to the biggest clan, A clan.

Early research and naming
A4 pod was one of the first pods photo-identified by Michael Bigg and Graeme Ellis in 1972. At that time, it was called “The Six” and was first thought to be part of A pod. When it became clear to researchers that these whales spent a significant amount of time apart from the rest of the group and had just happened to be travelling together when first identified, it was named A4 pod and A pod became A1 pod, A4 pod and A5 pod. Also, when the study began, it was assumed that orca pods were harems led by mature males. Thus, A4 pod was named after a large bull called A4 while it should have been named A10 pod after the matriarch A10.

Evolution of the pod
When A4 pod was first encountered, it travelled as one group led by the matriarch A10. In 1983, she and her youngest calf, A47, were shot at the rubbing beaches in Robson Bight. A whale watching vessel reported A47 bleeding profusely while being supported by its mother. Both of the whales died that winter. A10's probable daughters Yakat (A11) and Kelsey (A24) were left with the role of matriarchs while still being young adults. In 1986, the pod began splitting into two subpods, A11, led by Yakat and A24, led by Kelsey, but continued to spend most of their time together. Starting in the early 2000s, Yakat's oldest daughter Skagit (A35) and her offspring began spending time apart from the rest of the group, thus creating a third matriline, A35. After the death of Yakat, matriline A56 was formed with Nahwitti as matriarch. The A35s and the A56s are still most often seen together.

17 members of the A4 pod have died since the study begin, more than any other pod in the northern resident community. Kelsey (A24) lost her first five calves, as well as her two younger siblings. Yakat (A11) lost two offspring, one of her grandchildren and one of her great-grandchildren. In 2001, Kelsey's daughter Sutlej (A45) died, leaving two-year-old daughter Springer (A73) orphaned. In 2002, Springer was found alone and emaciated in Puget Sound, several hundreds of miles away from her family's home range. After being taken to Johnstone Strait and brought back to health, she was successfully reintroduced to wild whales before settling in with her grand aunt Yakat's matriline. In 2006, Yakat's son Skeena (A13) sustained an injury to the top of his dorsal fin and her great-grandchild Canoona (A82) was hit by a boat propeller. The whale then went missing and is now considered dead.

Having four reproductive females, A4 pod can be recognized by its large proportion of young calves and juveniles. They are much warier of boats than other pods and often prefer to stay far away from them despite being more tolerant than in the 1980s. They are one of the most commonly encountered groups of orcas, mostly due to their preference for the Johnstone Strait region during the summer and fall and are often seen with other Northern Resident pods, especially A1 and A5 pods which appear to be very closely related to one another. A4 pod is the only resident pod to frequently feed on pink salmon; other residents prefer the larger, fatter Chinook salmon.

In January 2013, 55-year-old matriarch Yakat (A11) was found dead on a beach near Ketchikan, Alaska. A full necropsy was performed to try to determine the cause of death.

Current status
As of March 2013, A4 pod consists of three matrilines and 15 members. The three matrilines are:

The A24 matriline, which consists of Kelsey's daughter Schooner (A64), born in 1995, her son Magin (A71), born in 1999, Toba (A78), born in 2003 and Mystery (A94), born in 2009, as well as Schooner's first offspring, Kanish (A89).

The A35 matriline, which consists of Yakat's daughter Skagit (A35), born in 1974, her daughter Kiltick (A52), born in 1987, her daughter Sunny (A70), born in 1999, Roller, born in 2003, Pine (A90), born in 2008 and Kiltick's own calf Nalau (A81), born in 2004.

The A56 matriline, which consists of Yakat's daughter Nahwitti (A56), born in 1990, her cousin once removed Springer (A73), born around 2000, Springer's offspring, Spirit (A104), born in 2013, her newest offspring Storm (A116), born in 2017 and Nahwitti's own offspring, Kalect (A97), born in 2010. The matriline was named after Yakat (A11) until her death in January 2013.

See also
 Springer
 A1 Pod
 A5 Pod
 List of Northern Resident Killer Whale Pods

Books
 Ford, John K.B.; Ellis, Graeme M.; & Balcomb, Kenneth C. (2000). Killer Whales (2nd ed.). UBC Press. . 
 Hoyt, Erich. (1990). Orca: The Whale Called Killer (3rd ed.). London: Robert Hale Limited. . 
 Morton, Alexandra. (2002). Listening To Whales : What the Orcas Have Taught Us. Ballantine Books. .

References 

Orcas